Lokman Polat (born 1956 in Lice, Diyarbakır Province) is a Swedish writer of Kurdish origin. Before 1980, he was involved in publishing political commentaries and news. He has been arrested several times due to his activities in the field of Kurdish literature, and was sentenced to 10 years in prison in absentia. He moved to Sweden in 1984 and began writing short stories in Kurdish. Lokam Polat is a founding member of the Kurdish Writers Association (Komela Nivîskarên Kurd), a member of the international PEN and a member of the Writers' Union of Sweden.

Works

He has published 14 books so far. Four of them are written in Turkish and the rest in Kurdish. His Kurdish books include three novels and seven short stories. He has also translated  four children books into Kurdish. He has been involved in journalism too and has published a journal titled Helwest.

Books

Barbar kasirgasi : kisa öyküler, 129 pp., Heviya Gel Publishers, Stockholm, 1989.  (in Turkish)
Evîn û Jiyan, 80 pp., Çanda Nûjen Publishers, Stockholm, 1992.
Torina Şêx Seîd, 112 pp., Hêvîva Gel Publishers, 1993.
Jin û zîndan, 79 pp., Çanda Nûjen Publishers, Stockholm, 1995.  
Xwîn û hêstirê çavan, 117 pp., Çanda Nûjen Publishers, Stockholm, 1995. 
Çîvanoka evînê, Translation of Samad Behrangi's work, 44 pp., Çanda Nûjen Publishers, Stockholm, 1995.  
Evîndar (bi pêşgotina Mehmed Uzun), 100 pp., Çanda Nûjen Publishers, Stockholm, 1996.  
Kurdistana sor, 58 pp., Çanda Nûjen Publishers, Stockholm, 1996. 
Mêrxas : serpêhatiyên Kurdî, 100 pp., Çanda Nûjen Publishers, Stockholm, 1996. 
Ji Nav Edebiyata Swêdê, 120 pp., Çanda Nûjen Publishers, Stockholm, 1997.  
Kewa Marî, novel, 274 pp., Çanda Nûjen Publishers, Stockholm, 1999. 
Fîlozof, novel, 163 pp., Helwest Publishers, 2002.
Rojnamevan, novel, 109 pp., Pêrî Publishers, 2002.

References 

 Kurdish The List of Kurdish Novels
 Swedish Lokman Polat, from Immigrant Institute

1956 births
Living people
People from Lice, Turkey
Turkish Kurdish people
Turkish emigrants to Sweden
Kurdish-language writers
Turkish writers
Swedish male writers